"Go Your Own Way" is a 1976 song by Fleetwood Mac.

Go Your Own Way may also refer to:

Other music
 Go Your Own Way (album), an album by Gareth Gates (2003)
"Go Your Own Way", single by Yumi Shizukusa (2007)
"Go Your Own Way", song on Determination (God Forbid album) (2001)
"Go Your Own Way", song on Ordinary Alien album by Boy George (2010)
"Go Your Own Way", single by Tia London (2016)
"Go Your Own Way", single by Canadian singers Drake Jensen and Patrick Masse (2017)

Other uses
 Go Your Own Way, a slogan to promote Tourism in Albania
 "Go your own way", slogan of Independence Air
"Go Your Own Way", episode of animated TV series Rolling with the Ronks! (2016)
"Go Your Own Way", episode of TV series Dexter (season 3) (2008)

See also
"You Can Go Your Own Way", song by Chris Rea